The Norcross Building (4 Marietta Street NW, Atlanta) occupied the southwest corner of Peachtree Street and Marietta Street at Five Points in downtown Atlanta. Today the Andrew Young School of Policy Studies is located on the site. The building was owned by Jonathan Norcross, "father of Atlanta."

An 1859 directory already lists a Norcross Building in this location at that time. Mr. Norcross had owned the site since at least 1844, having paid $265 for the lot.

1894 building
In 1894 a new landmark Norcross Building went up which stood until destroyed by fire in December 1902. The Atlanta Constitution called the building "one of the handsomest office buildings in the city", "an honor to Atlanta" and " a splendid ornament to the site". The architect was G.L. Norman. The building cost about $35,000 to complete. The interiors were lavish, with hard oak doors, window facings and wainscoting. There were two elevators, one electric. The building was constructed to allow for up to 3 additional stories, which are in place on a photo from the Atlanta History Center's collection.

The building was immediately replaced by a new fourteen-story steel building, ultimately known as the Fourth National Bank Building.

Tenants
The building was next-to-last location for Alonzo Herndon's barbershop.

Other tenants included, at one time or another:
 Nonesuch Lunchroom
 Venable Soda Water Company
 Harry L. Roan's cigar stand
 Bob Steele, "colored barber"
 Jacobs' Pharmacy, later Hammock & Lucas Pharmacy

References

Demolished buildings and structures in Atlanta
Burned buildings and structures in the United States
Rebuilt buildings and structures in the United States
1902 fires in the United States
Office buildings in Atlanta
Buildings and structures demolished in 1902
1902 in Georgia (U.S. state)
Fires in Georgia (U.S. state)